João Vicente da Nova (born 1 April 1907; date of death unknown) was a Portuguese footballer who played as a midfielder.

External links

Portuguese footballers
Association football midfielders
Primeira Liga players
Boavista F.C. players
FC Porto players
Portugal international footballers
Place of birth missing
1907 births
Year of death missing